Plicatin may refer to:
 Plicatin A, a hydroxycinnamic acid
 Plicatin B, a hydroxycinnamic acid